Shota Ogawa is a Japanese sport wrestler who competes in the men's Greco Roman category. He claimed bronze medal in the men's 55 kg event during the 2019 World Wrestling Championships.

References 

Living people
Japanese male sport wrestlers
World Wrestling Championships medalists
Year of birth missing (living people)
21st-century Japanese people